Elna Co. Ltd is a Japanese manufacturer of electrolytic and electric double layer capacitors. It also produces custom printed circuit boards for OEM use. The company took on the name "Elna" when it acquired Elna Electronics Co. in March 1968. However, the company was established in 1937, though not under the name "Elna". Elna's headquarters is located in Yokohama, Japan.

References 

 http://www.elna.co.jp/en/company/data.html

Capacitor manufacturers
Electronics companies established in 1937
Manufacturing companies based in Yokohama
Electronics companies of Japan
Japanese companies established in 1937
Japanese brands